Meemannia is a genus of extinct bony fish from the early Devonian period. It was initially classified as a lobe-finned fish; however, a restudy conducted by Lu et al. (2016) indicates that it was actually an early-diverging ray-finned fish. It was found in Yunnan, China.  As preserved, it consists mainly of skull roofing bones and a partial otic region of the braincase.  Its anatomy is unique in a number of features that resemble ray-finned fishes (Actinopterygii), and more generalized jawed vertebrates.

It was described in the May 4, 2006 edition of Nature, and named after Meemann Chang.

References 

Prehistoric ray-finned fish genera
Devonian bony fish
Fossils of China
Fossil taxa described in 2006